Sultan Ibrahim Mosque is the district mosque of Kuala Selangor, Selangor, Malaysia.

History
The mosque's cost of construction was RM 10.7 million, which was fully borne by the state government. Construction began in 1980 and was completed in 1982. The mosque was officially opened in 1982 by Almarhum Sultan Salahuddin Abdul Aziz Shah of Selangor during his official visit to Kuala Selangor.

Architecture
It was built in a Modernist style.

See also
 Islam in Malaysia

1982 establishments in Malaysia
Kuala Selangor District
Mosques completed in 1982
Mosques in Selangor